Witternesse is a commune in the Pas-de-Calais department in the Hauts-de-France region of France.

Geography
The A26 autoroute passes by the commune.

Population

Places of interest
 The church of St.Martin, dating from the seventeenth century.
 The watermill.
 The seventeenth century priory, now a peoples home.
 The manor and museum of La Besvre.

See also
Communes of the Pas-de-Calais department

References

Communes of Pas-de-Calais